The Kentuckian is a 1908 short silent black-and-white Western film directed by Wallace McCutcheon, Sr. and starring Edward Dillon, Florence Auer and Mack Sennett. It is about an intermarriage between Indians and white people. The film provides a type of Indian hero.

Cast
 Edward Dillon as Ward Fatherly
 Florence Auer
 D. W. Griffith as Card Sharp
 George Gebhardt
 Harry Solter
 Mack Sennett
 Anthony O'Sullivan
 John G. Adolfi
 Wallace McCutcheon Jr.
 Robert G. Vignola

References

External links
 

1908 films
1908 Western (genre) films
1908 short films
American black-and-white films
American silent short films
Biograph Company films
Films directed by Wallace McCutcheon Sr.
Films shot in New Jersey
Films with screenplays by Stanner E.V. Taylor
Silent American Western (genre) films
1900s American films
1900s English-language films